Hans-Ulrich Buchholz (1 November 1944 – 9 August 2011) was a German rower. He competed in the men's eight event at the 1972 Summer Olympics.

References

External links
 

1944 births
2011 deaths
German male rowers
Olympic rowers of West Germany
Rowers at the 1972 Summer Olympics
People from Rendsburg
Sportspeople from Schleswig-Holstein